Die Geigen- und Lautenmacher vom Mittelalter bis zur Gegenwart (The Violin and Lute Makers From the Middle Ages to the Present) is one of the earliest comprehensive reference books for violins and luthiers. It was compiled by Willibald Leo von Lütgendorff (1856–1937) and originally published in 1904.

Editions 

 1st ed. (1 Vol.), Frankfurt am Main: Verlag von Heinrich Keller (1904)
 (online copy via Internet Archive)
 

 Nachtrag (supplement), Altenburg: Pierersche Hofbuchdruckerei Stephan Geibel & Co. (1905?)
 (online copy via HathiTrust)
 

 4th ed. (2 Vols.) Frankfurt am Main: Verlag von Heinrich Keller (1913)
 
 

 6th ed. Frankfurt am Main: Frankfurter Verlag-Anstalt A.G. (de) (publisher) (1922)
 Vol. 1 (online copy via Google Books)
 Vol. 2 (online copy via Internet Archive)
 

 5th and 6th ed. (reprint), Nendeln, Liechtenstein: Kraus Reprint Ltd. (1968)
 

 6th ed. (reprint), Tutzing: Hans Schneider (de) (publisher) (1975)
 
 

 Ergänzungsband (supplement, as Vol. 3), by Thomas Drescher, Tutzing: Hans Schneider (de) (1990)

References 

Encyclopedias of music
1904 non-fiction books
Lutherie reference books